is a Japanese comedian, television presenter, radio personality, actor, businessman, triathlete, and racing driver. He is the president of Be Company.

While Be Company is from Production Jin Riki-sha, Hiromi is represented with Tanabe Agency and later Production No Title since 2008. His wife is singer Iyo Matsumoto. Hiromi's eldest son is tarento Ryo Kozono.

Auto racing
Hiromi made his debut in the Super GT championship in 2004 as one of Team Gaikokuya's drivers in the GT300 class, partnering former GT300 champion Yoshimi Ishibashi in the team's Porsche 911 GT3. He failed to score a championship point and secured a best finish of 18th place in the fifth round at Twin Ring Motegi. Two years later in February 2006, he announced his return to the series as part of the 06H Project, driving one of 's Ferrari 360 in the GT300 class for the full-season. He once again failed to score a championship point in 2006, scoring a best finish of 14th in the fourth round at Sepang.

Racing records

Complete JGTC/Super GT results
(key) (Races in bold indicate pole position) (Races in italics indicate fastest lap)

Filmography

TV series

Current appearances
Regular programmes

Special programmes

Former appearances
Regular programmes

Specials

Radio

TV drama

Films

Internet series

Direct-to-video

Advertisements

Works

DVD

Discography

Bibliography

References

External links
Be Company 

Japanese comedians
Japanese television presenters
Japanese racing drivers
Super GT drivers
Japanese businesspeople
1965 births
Living people
Male actors from Tokyo
Comedians from Tokyo
Do it yourself